The inguinal canals are the two passages in the anterior abdominal wall of humans and animals which in males convey the spermatic cords and in females the round ligament of the uterus. The inguinal canals are larger and more prominent in males. There is one inguinal canal on each side of the midline.

Structure
The inguinal canals are situated just above the medial half of the inguinal ligament. In both sexes the canals transmit the ilioinguinal nerves. The canals are approximately 3.75 to 4 cm long. , angled anteroinferiorly and medially. In males, its diameter is normally 2 cm (±1 cm in standard deviation) at the deep inguinal ring.

A first-order approximation is to visualize each canal as a cylinder.

Walls
To help define the boundaries, these canals are often further approximated as boxes with six sides. Not including the two rings, the remaining four sides are usually called the "anterior wall", "inferior wall ("floor")", "superior wall ("roof")", and "posterior wall". These consist of the following:

Deep inguinal ring
The deep inguinal ring (internal or deep abdominal ring, abdominal inguinal ring, internal inguinal ring) is the entrance to the inguinal canal.

Location
The surface marking of the deep inguinal ring is classically described as half an inch above the midpoint of the inguinal ligament .

However, the surface anatomy of the point is disputed. In a recent study it was found to be in a region between the mid-inguinal point (situated midway between the anterior superior iliac spine and the pubic symphysis) and the midpoint of the inguinal ligament (i.e. midway between the anterior superior iliac spine and the pubic tubercle). Traditionally, either one of these two sites was claimed as its location. However, this claim is based upon the study's dissection of 52 cadavers, and may not reflect the live in vivo anatomy.

Some sources state that it is at the layer of the transversalis fascia.

Description
It is of an oval form, the long axis of the oval being vertical; it varies in size in different subjects, and is much larger in the male than in the female. It is bounded, above and laterally, by the arched lower margin of the transversalis fascia; below and medially, by the inferior epigastric vessels. It transmits the spermatic cord in the male and the round ligament of the uterus in the female.

From its circumference a thin funnel-shaped membrane, the infundibuliform fascia, is continued around the cord and testis, enclosing them in a distinct covering.

Superficial inguinal ring

The superficial inguinal ring (subcutaneous inguinal ring or external inguinal ring) is an anatomical structure in the anterior wall of the mammalian abdomen. It is a triangular opening that forms the exit of the inguinal canal, which houses the ilioinguinal nerve, the genital branch of the genitofemoral nerve, and the spermatic cord (in men) or the round ligament (in women). At the other end of the canal, the deep inguinal ring forms the entrance.

It is found within the aponeurosis of the external oblique, immediately above the pubic crest, 1 centimeter above and superolateral to the pubic tubercle. 
It has the following boundaries—medial crura by pubic crest, lateral crura by pubic tubercle and inferiorly by inguinal ligament.

Development in the male 
During development each testicle descends from the starting point on the posterior abdominal wall (para-aortically) from the labioscrotal swellings  near the kidneys, down the abdomen, and through the inguinal canals to reach the scrotum. This way, each testicle descends through the abdominal wall into the scrotum, behind the processus vaginalis (which later obliterates). Thus lymphatic spread from a testicular tumour is to the para-aortic nodes first, and not the inguinal nodes.

Function
The structures which pass through the canals differ between males and females:
 in males: the spermatic cord and its coverings + the ilioinguinal nerve.
 in females: the round ligament of the uterus + the ilioinguinal nerve.

The classic description of the contents of the spermatic cords in the male are:

3 arteries: artery to vas deferens (or ductus deferens), testicular artery, cremasteric artery;

3 fascial layers: external spermatic, cremasteric, and internal spermatic fascia;

3 other structures: pampiniform plexus, vas deferens (ductus deferens), testicular lymphatics;

3 nerves: genital branch of the genitofemoral nerve (L1/2), sympathetic and visceral afferent fibres, ilioinguinal nerve (N.B. outside spermatic cord but travels next to it)

Note that the ilioinguinal nerve passes through the superficial ring to descend into the scrotum, but does not formally run through the canal.

Clinical significance

Abdominal contents (potentially including intestine) can be abnormally displaced from the abdominal cavity. Where these contents exit through the inguinal canal, having passed through the deep inguinal ring, the condition is known as an indirect or oblique inguinal hernia. This can also cause infertility. This condition is far more common in males than in females, owing to the inguinal canal's small size in females.

A hernia that exits the abdominal cavity directly through the deep layers of the abdominal wall, thereby bypassing the inguinal canal, is known as a direct inguinal hernia.

In males with strong presentation of the cremasteric reflex, the testes can—during supine sexual activity or manual manipulation—partially or fully retract into the inguinal canal for a short period of time. In juveniles and adults with inguinal injury, retraction can be prolonged and potentially lead to overheating-related infertility.

The superficial ring is palpable under normal conditions. It becomes dilated in a condition called athletic pubalgia. Abdominal contents may protrude through the ring in inguinal hernia.

Additional images

See also
 Superficial inguinal ring
 Inguinal hernia
 Tucking

Notes

References

 Adam Mitchell; Drake, Richard; Gray, Henry David; Wayne Vogl (2010). Gray's anatomy for students. Elsevier/Churchill Livingstone. pp. 286. .

External links
 
  - "The inguinal canal and derivation of the layers of the spermatic cord."
 
  - "Anterior Abdominal Wall: Borders of the Superficial Inguinal Ring"
  - "The inguinal canal and derivation of the layers of the spermatic cord."
  - "The Male & Female Inguinal Canal"
 Diagram at nurseminerva.co.uk
 
  - "The Coverings of the Inguinal Canal, External & Internal Oblique & Transversus Abdominis Removed"

Abdomen